SS310, SS 310 or SS-310 may refer to:

Military
 USS Batfish (SS-310)

Transportation
 Strada statale 310 del Bidente (SS 310), a former Italian state highway